Kenta Yamazaki (born May 19, 1987) is a professional footballer from Adachi, Tokyo, Japan.

In summer 2014, Yamazaki transferred from FK Berane, having played with them in the 2013–14 Montenegrin Second League, to OFK Grbalj, playing with them in the 2014–15 Montenegrin First League.

Clubs 

Youth

Senior

Honor

Ubon UMT United

Regional League Division 2:
Winners : 2015
Regional League North-East Division
 Runner-up : 2015

International

References

External links
 
 
 europlus.jp
 tokyo23fc.jp

1987 births
Living people
Association football people from Tokyo
Japanese expatriate sportspeople in Cambodia
Japanese footballers
Association football midfielders
Kenta Yamazaki
OFK Grbalj players
FK Berane players
Montenegrin First League players
Expatriate footballers in Montenegro
Kenta Yamazaki
Kenta Yamazaki
Expatriate footballers in Thailand
Expatriate footballers in Cambodia